Capitani is a Luxembourgish crime drama series created by , , and  that premiered on 1 October 2019 on RTL Télé Lëtzebuerg. Capitani is the first Luxembourgish crime series as well as the country's first Netflix series.

The first season was produced by Samsa Film, in collaboration with RTL and Artémis Productions, with support from Film Fund Luxembourg. Season 2 added Shelter Productions to its roster.

The show was acquired by Netflix and began streaming on 11 February 2021. It was renewed for a second season, again directed by Wagner. 
Season 2 premiered on RTL on 22 February 2022 and began streaming on Netflix on 8 July 2022.

Synopsis
Season 1

The body of fifteen-year-old Jenny Engel is found in a forest near the fictional village of Manscheid (Mënscht), in the north of Luxembourg. Inspector Luc Capitani is called in from the south of the country to investigate the murder. He is assisted by young local police officer Elsa Ley. Capitani has difficulty dealing with the villagers' mentality. During their investigation, the two penetrate further into a complicated web of intrigue in which nothing is as it seems, and it becomes clear that the villagers know more than they admit. In the course of the investigation, Inspector Capitani must not only track down a murderer, but also understand the mindset of each individual resident and break open a system in which many people are manipulated for the "common good". The story unfolds over the span of eight days.

Season 2

Four years after the events of Season 1, Capitani, who had been fired from the police force and convicted as an accessory to the murder of a drug dealer, has been released from prison due to inadequate evidence and is now living in a run-down area of Luxembourg City. He is hired by a sex worker to find a friend who has disappeared. Subsequently, he goes undercover for the prosecutor to investigate, and break up, the drug trade in the city.

Cast and characters
Principal and recurring
 Luc Schiltz as Luc Capitani
  as Elsa Ley
  as Carla Pereira / Sofia Santos
  as Steve Weis
  as Jenny / Tanja Engel
 Joe Dennenwald as Joe Mores

Season 1
  as Nadine Kinsch
  as Mick Engel
 Raoul Schlechter as Rob Berens
 Pierre Bodry as Pastor Claude Glodt
  as Usch Trierweiler
  as Pierre Rommes
  as Manon Boever
 Esther Gaspart Michels as Lea Holmes
  as Gérard Gaspard
 Max Gindorff as Jerry Kowalska
 Timo Wagner as Frank Ferrone
 Désirée Nosbusch as Diane Bonifas
  as Jim Boever

Season 2
 Edita Malovčić as Valentina Draga
 Edson Anibal as Lucky Onu
 Tommy Schlesser as Arthur Koenig
 André Jung as Gibbes Koenig
 Lydia Indjova as Bianca Petrova
 Adrien Papritz as Dominik Draga
 Céline Camara as Stella Abasi
 Philippe Thelen as Toni Scholtes

Episodes
The title of each episode of the first season is a line from poems and songs by Luxembourgish poet Michel Lentz, best known for composing the country's national anthem.

Production
The budget for the first season was 2.6 million Euros. Of this, €2.1 million came from the Film Fund Luxembourg, which had already supported the development of the script with €50,000 in 2017. RTL contributed €300,000, with the rest coming from Samsa Film and Artémis Productions.

In June–July 2020, Film Fund Luxembourg supported the script development of the second season with €120,000. In November 2020, FFL contributed another €1,300,000 towards filming. The total cost for the second season amounted to approximately €4 million.

The first season was set in the fictional village of Manscheid. Most of the filming took place in Junglinster, with locations including the town of Gonderange and Bourglinster. Additional filming was done in Wiltz, Kopstal, and Lintgen.

Season 2 was filmed from March to June 2021.

Reception
The first season of the series broke all records in its respective category on RTL Télé Lëtzebuerg. Polling firm TNS Ilres determined that an average of 147,500 viewers watched each episode upon its initial release, corresponding to 29% of the population of Luxembourg aged sixteen and over. A survey by InternetPanel.lu showed that 90.4% of viewers were interested in seeing a second season.

In a review, Forbes wrote, "... Capitani proves to be a very well-paced series with complex storylines, slowly letting all the lies and secrets surrounding the small village unravel."

References

External links
 
 

Luxembourgish crime television series
Luxembourgish-language television shows
2010s crime television series
Television shows set in Luxembourg
Television shows filmed in Luxembourg
Luxembourgish-language Netflix original programming